Vaskojoki is a river of Finland. It is located in Lemmenjoki National Park in Finnish Lapland.

See also
List of rivers of Finland

Rivers of Finland
Rivers of Inari, Finland
Paatsjoki basin